Food for Animals were an American hip hop group formed in 2001 near Washington, D.C. The group featured Vulture Voltaire (Andrew Field-Pickering), Ricky Rabbit (Nick Rivetti), Dr. Dan (Daniel Helmer), and HY (Sterling Warren). Their music was generally categorized as underground hip hop with a strong tendency towards noise music. According to Pitchfork, their latest albums feature a sound best appreciated by "those with a high tolerance for serial grime and a taste for the sharper, harder edge of hip-hop".

History
Field Pickering, a Washington, D.C. DJ, and Ricky Rabbit formed the band  and quickly booked gigs along the East Coast, shows which occasionally caused comparisons with Public Enemy and found praise from critics.

Discography
Food For Animals
Strictly Ricky  (2003)
Scavengers  (2004, Muckamuck Produce/Upper Class)
Belly Remixes  (2005)
Belly  (2008, HOSS Records/Cockrockdisco)

Ricky's Remixes
Mi Ami - African Rhythms (rRicky Remix)  (2008)
K-Swift - (Ricky Screwed Mix)  (2008)
Late Summer  (2009)
Ecstatic Sunshine - Turned On (rRicky Remix)  (2009)
Lexie Mountain Boys (Ricky Remix)  (2009)
Bluebird - (rRicky Remix)  (2009)

Maxmillion Dunbar (Vulture V)

Albums
Cool Water  (2010, Ramp Records)
House of Woo  (2013, RVNG Intl.)
Boost  (2016, Future Times)
Many Any  (2019, 1432 R)
Singles & EPs
Outrageous Soulz / Dreamerzzz  (2008, Future Times)
Bare Feet EP  (2009, Ramp Recordings)
Girls Dream  (2010, Ramp Recordings)
Max Trax For World Peace  (2011, Future Times)
Everyday EP  (2011, L.I.E.S. Records)
Woo  (2012, RVNG Intl.)
Orgies Of The Hemp Eaters  (2012, Future Times)
Polo (Versions)  (2012, Live At Robert Johnson)
Drizzling Glass  (2014, The Trilogy Tapes)
Highlife  (2014, Hot Haus Recs)
This Ain't Tom N' Jerry / Chewy  (2014, Berceuse Heroique)
Shoegaze  (2014, Falstaff)
Shaping EP  (2015, Off Minor Recordings)
Compilations
Feel Free  (2007)
DJ Mixes
LWE Podcast 130  (2012, Little White Earbuds)
FACT Mix 374  (2013, FACT MAGAZINE)
Woo Daps Mix Tape  (2013, RVNG Intl.)
Unwind Flex  (2014, XLR8R)
People Are Tripping  (2018, The Trilogy Tapes)
Miscellaneous
Berceuse Heroique Presents The B Sides  (2015, Berceuse Heroique)
Truancy Volume 53: Maxmillion Dunbar  (2020, Ndeya, Warp Records)

Dolo Percussion (Vulture V)

Singles & EPs
Dolo Percussion  (2013, L.I.E.S Records)
Dolo 2  (2014, Future Times)
Dolo 3  (2018, The Trilogy Tapes)
Compilations
Dolo 4  (2019, Future Times)

Ricky Rabbit
*** I GOT U *** (single PRANCE)  (2012)
DOG DIMENSION  (2013)
BRAIDED ROPE 158 (Lo Mix)  (2020)
BRAIDED ROPE 158 (Ride Mix)  (2020)
CENTIPEDE (Ft. PSYCHO EGYPTIAN)  (2021)
PRANCE (2013)  (2021)

References

External links
 Muckamuck
 Cock Rock Disco
 Cokemachineglow

Musical groups from Washington, D.C.
American hip hop groups